Qi'ao Island is an island of Zhuhai, Guangdong province, China.

Introduction
Qi'ao Island is located in the northeast Xiangzhou District of Zhuhai, 13 km away from it. Totally, it covers an area of 23.8 square kilometers. There are about 1,900 inhabitants. Forest coverage reaches 90%.

History

In the ancient ruins of Housha Bay and Dong'ao Bay, archaeologists discovered plentiful colored pottery and white pottery which can date back to 4,500 to 5,000 years ago. These pottery are evidence of the most early history of this city, and Dong'ao Bay is the most typical and complete gravel ruins of Pearl River Delta. In this small island, there are 17 temples here, which discloses the richness of its historic memories. For instance, Cundong started building in Song Dynasty and Wenchang Palace built in Qing Dynasty during the reign of the Tongzhi Emperor.

Also, in October 1833 before the first Opium War between China and British, there was an event, Qi'ao Cun Event, known as the struggle against foreign aggression, which plays a vital role in the history of Chinese people against foreign aggression. At that time, British fleets invaded Qi'ao Island from the ocean, intending to sell opium there. However, the villagers in Qi'ao Island organized a successful resistance movement, through which they were compensated silver 3,000 liang.

Educational base

Given the Qi'ao Cun Event in 1833, a famous patriotic poem called Guo Ling Ding Yang by Wen Tianxiang, and the preservation of Su Zhaozheng's Former Residence, in 2000, 20 CPPCC members proposed Qi'ao Island as a nationwide educational base.

Scenic spots
In 2000, it was identified as an ecological tourist zone of Zhuhai. The island is noted for its seafood, such as oysters and Niwei chicken.

See also

 Qi'ao Bridge
 Cumsingmoon
 Zhuhai International School

References

Islands of Zhuhai
Islands of China
Populated places in China